Noleysi Bicet (or Noleysis Vicet, born 6 February 1981) is a male hammer thrower from Cuba. His personal best throw is 75.40 metres, achieved in May 2011 in Havana.

He won the gold medal at the 2006 Central American and Caribbean Games. He also became Cuban champion in 2006.

Personal best
Hammer throw: 75.40 –  La Habana, 20 May 2011

Achievements

References

1981 births
Living people
Athletes (track and field) at the 2011 Pan American Games
Cuban male hammer throwers
Pan American Games bronze medalists for Cuba
Pan American Games medalists in athletics (track and field)
Central American and Caribbean Games gold medalists for Cuba
Competitors at the 2006 Central American and Caribbean Games
Central American and Caribbean Games medalists in athletics
Medalists at the 2011 Pan American Games
21st-century Cuban people